is the thirteenth single by Bump of Chicken, released on October 24, 2007. The title track is from the album Orbital Period.

Track listing
 (Fujiwara Motoo)
 (Fujiwara)
 (Hidden track)

Personnel
Fujiwara Motoo — Guitar, vocals
Masukawa Hiroaki — Guitar
Naoi Yoshifumi — Bass
Masu Hideo — drums

Chart performance

References

External links
花の名 on the official Bump of Chicken website.

2007 singles
Bump of Chicken songs
Oricon Weekly number-one singles
2007 songs
Toy's Factory singles
Japanese film songs